The following units and commanders fought at the Second Battle of Saratoga, The Battle of Bemis Heights, on October 7, 1777.

British army
General John Burgoyne

American army
Major General Horatio Gates

Staff
Adjutant General: Lt Colonel James Wilkinson
Quartermaster: Lt Colonel Morgan Lewis
Engineers: Col Thaddeus Kosciusko

Sources
 Luzader, John. F. Saratoga: A Military History of the Decisive Campaign of the American Revolution. Savas Beatie, 2008. 
 Weddle, Kevin. The Compleat Victory: Saratoga and the American Revolution. — Oxford University Press, 2021. — 544 p. — .
 Craig, Joe. “The Battles of Saratoga.” Cobblestone, vol. 20, no. 8, Nov. 1999, p. 20. EBSCOhost, https://search-ebscohost-com.rocky.iona.edu/login.aspx?direct=true&db=ulh&AN=2416003&site=ehost-live&scope=site.
 Loiselle, Brett. “The Battles of Saratoga.” Battles of Saratoga, Aug. 2017, pp. 1–2. EBSCOhost, https://search-ebscohost-com.rocky.iona.edu/login.aspx?direct=true&db=ulh&AN=17916678&site=ehost-live&scope=site. 
 Seymour, William. “Turning Point at Saratoga.” Military History, vol. 16, no. 5, Dec. 1999, p. 46. EBSCOhost, https://search-ebscohost-com.rocky.iona.edu/login.aspx?direct=true&db=afh&AN=2405767&site=ehost-live&scope=site.

American Revolutionary War orders of battle
Saratoga campaign